Oh Na-ra (is a South Korean television and film actress, known for her roles in Yong-pal, Hyde, Jekyll, Me, Flowers of the Prison, Man to Man, The Lady in Dignity,  and Sky Castle.

Filmography

Film

Television series

Television shows

Web shows

Awards and nominations

Notes

References

External links 
 
 

1974 births
Living people
South Korean television actresses
South Korean film actresses
Kyung Hee University alumni
Dankook University alumni